Birch Cove is a subdivision and a cove in the community of Bedford within the Halifax Regional Municipality in Nova Scotia, Canada, on the shore of Bedford Basin and along the Bedford Highway (Trunk 2). The name is after the birch trees that hung over the cove by William Donaldson, who named his estate Birch Cove.

History
The Mi'kmaq used the area as a summer camping ground until the 1920s, there are also traces of an early Acadian village. A gravesite was uncovered in 1890 and scientific analysis proved they were actually Acadian soldiers.

External links
Destination Nova Scotia

Communities in Halifax, Nova Scotia